A detail is an isolated element within a work of art, especially in the visual arts and literature. Being part of the general composition of the work of art, it can stimulate a subsequent development in criticism or analysis. The detail can have an unsuspected importance, such as being symbolic. Certain details are thus considered to be particularly remarkable in the light of cultural history, for example, the smile of La Mona Lisa in painting.

References
Real Academia Española y Asociación de Academias de la Lengua Española (2014). «detalle». Diccionario de la lengua española (23.ª edición). Madrid: Espasa. ISBN 978-84-670-4189-7

Art criticism